Müllerian agenesis, also known as Müllerian aplasia, vaginal agenesis, or Mayer-Rokitansky-Küster-Hauser syndrome (MRKH syndrome), is a congenital malformation characterized by a failure of the Müllerian ducts to develop, resulting in a missing uterus and variable degrees of vaginal hypoplasia of its upper portion. Müllerian agenesis (including absence of the uterus, cervix and/or vagina) is the cause in 15% of cases of primary amenorrhoea. Because most of the vagina does not develop from the Müllerian duct, instead developing from the urogenital sinus, along with the bladder and urethra, it is present even when the Müllerian duct is completely absent. Because ovaries do not develop from the Müllerian ducts, affected people might have normal secondary sexual characteristics but are infertile due to the lack of a functional uterus. However, parenthood is possible through use of gestational surrogates.

Müllerian agenesis is hypothesized to be a result of autosomal dominant inheritance with incomplete penetrance and variable expressivity, which contributes to the complexity involved in identifying of the underlying mechanisms causing the condition. Because of the variance in inheritance, penetrance and expressivity patterns, Müllerian agenesis is subdivided into two types: type 1, in which only the structures developing from the Müllerian duct are affected (the upper vagina, cervix, and uterus), and type 2, where the same structures are affected, but is characterized by the additional malformations of other body systems most often including the renal and skeletal systems. Type 2 includes MURCS (Müllerian Renal Cervical Somite).

The majority of Müllerian agenesis cases are characterized as sporadic, but familial cases have provided evidence that, at least for some patients, it is an inherited disorder. The underlying causes are still being investigated, but several causative genes have been studied for their possible association with the syndrome. Most of these studies have served to rule-out genes as causative factors, but thus far, only WNT4 has been associated with Müllerian agenesis with hyperandrogenism.

Reports of Müllerian agenesis can be traced back to Hippocrates (460 B.C.–377 B.C.). The medical eponym honors August Franz Josef Karl Mayer (1787–1865), Carl Freiherr von Rokitansky (1804–1878), Hermann Küster (1879–1964) and Georges Andre Hauser (1921–2009).

Signs and symptoms
A female with this condition is hormonally normal; that is, the woman will enter puberty with development of secondary sexual characteristics including thelarche and pubarche (pubic hair). The woman's karyotype will be 46,XX. At least one ovary is intact, if not both, and ovulation usually occurs. Typically, the vagina is shortened and intercourse may, in some cases, be difficult and painful. Medical examination supported by gynecologic ultrasonography demonstrates a complete or partial absence of the cervix, uterus, and vagina.

If there is no uterus, a woman with Müllerian agenesis cannot carry a pregnancy without intervention. It is possible for the woman to have genetic offspring by in vitro fertilization (IVF) and surrogacy. Successful uterine transplant has been performed in limited numbers of patients, resulting in several live births, but the technique is not widespread or accessible to many women.

A woman with Müllerian agenesis typically discovers the condition when, during puberty years, the menstrual cycle does not start (primary amenorrhoea). Some find out earlier through surgeries for other conditions, such as a hernia.

Causes
The etiology of Müllerian agenesis in many cases remains elusive. However, mutations in a variety of different genes have been implicated in causing MRKH syndrome. The typical and atypical forms of the disorder are presumably caused by mutations in different genes.

WNT4 (found on the short arm (p) of chromosome 1) has been clearly implicated in the atypical version of this disorder. A genetic mutation causes a leucine to proline residue substitution at amino acid position 12. This occurrence reduces the intranuclear levels of β catenin. In addition, it removes the inhibition of steroidogenic enzymes like 3β-hydroxysteriod dehydrogenase and 17α-hydroxylase. Patients therefore have androgen excess. Furthermore, without WNT4, the Müllerian duct is either deformed or absent. Female reproductive organs, such as the cervix, fallopian tubes, and much of the vagina, are hence affected.

An association with 17q12 microdeletion syndrome, a deletion mutation in the long arm (q) of chromosome 17, has been reported. The gene LHX1 is located in this region and may be the cause of a number of these cases.

Diagnosis

Classification
 Typical Müllerian agenesis – Isolated uterovaginal aplasia/hypoplasia
 Prevalence – 64%
 Atypical Müllerian agenesis – Uterovaginal aplasia/hypoplasia with renal malformation or uterovaginal aplasia/hypoplasia with ovarian dysfunction
 Prevalence – 24%
 MURCS syndrome – Uterovaginal aplasia/hypoplasia with renal malformation, skeletal malformation, and cardiac malformation
 Prevalence – 12%

Treatment
A number of treatments have become available to create a functioning vagina, the first successful uterus transplantation has been done in 2021, giving fertility to the transplant recipient. Standard approaches use vaginal dilators and/or surgery to develop a functioning vagina to allow for penetrative sexual intercourse. A number of surgical approaches have been used. In the McIndoe procedure, a skin graft is applied to form an artificial vagina. After the surgery, dilators are still necessary to prevent vaginal stenosis. The Vecchietti procedure has been shown to result in a vagina that is comparable to a normal vagina in patients. In the Vecchietti procedure, a small plastic “olive” is threaded against the vaginal area, and the threads are drawn through the vaginal skin, up through the abdomen and through the navel using laparoscopic surgery. There the threads are attached to a traction device. The operation takes about 45 minutes. The traction device is then tightened daily so the olive is pulled inwards and stretches the vagina by approximately 1 cm per day, creating a vagina approximately 7 cm deep in 7 days, although it can be more than this. Another approach is the use of an autotransplant of a resected sigmoid colon using laparoscopic surgery; results are reported to be very good with the transplant becoming a functional vagina.

Uterine transplantation has been performed in a number of people with Müllerian agenesis, but the surgery is still in the experimental stage. Since ovaries are present, people with this condition can have genetic children through IVF with embryo transfer to a gestational carrier. Some also choose to adopt. In October 2014, it was reported that a month earlier a 36-year-old Swedish woman became the first woman with a transplanted uterus to give birth to a healthy baby. She was born without a uterus, but had functioning ovaries. She and the father went through IVF to produce 11 embryos, which were then frozen. Doctors at the University of Gothenburg then performed the uterus transplant, the donor being a 61-year-old family friend. One of the frozen embryos was implanted a year after the transplant, and the baby boy was born prematurely at 31 weeks after the mother developed pre-eclampsia.

Promising research include the use of laboratory-grown structures, which are less subject to the complications of non-vaginal tissue, and may be grown using the woman's own cells as a culture source. The recent development of engineered vaginas using the patient's own cells has resulted in fully functioning vaginas capable of menstruation and orgasm in a number of patients showing promise of fully correcting this condition.

Epidemiology
The prevalence remains sparsely investigated. To date, two population-based nationwide studies have been conducted both estimating a prevalence about 1 in 5,000 live female births. According to some reports, Queen Amalia of Greece may have had the syndrome, but a 2011 review of the historical evidence concludes that it is not possible to determine the inability of her and her husband to have a child. Their inability to conceive an heir contributed to the overthrow of the king King Otto.

People with Müllerian agenesis 
 Ben Barres, transgender male scientist
 Esther Morris Leidolf, medical sociologist and intersex activist
 Stephanie Lum, Australian intersex activist
 Shon Klose, Australian intersex activist and musician
 Jaclyn Schultz, Miss Michigan

Suspected cases 
 Eva Braun
 Amalia of Oldenburg

See also 
 MURCS association
 Cervical agenesis
 WNT4 deficiency
 SERKAL syndrome
 Regenerative medicine
 MRKH

References

Further reading

External links 
 
 American College of Obstetricians and Gynecologists, Müllerian Agenesis: Resource Overview

Congenital disorders of female genital organs
Pediatric gynecology
Intersex variations
Congenital malformations of uterus and cervix